The Koon House No. 3 is a historic house at 2988 U.S. Highway 167 in Sheridan, Arkansas.  It is a single story structure, built out of vertically placed small logs, split in half and set smooth side in and round side out.  It is roughly rectangular in shape, with a gable roof and a gabled front porch.  A small rectangular section projects from on side near the rear.  The house was built about 1940 by Hillary Henry "Pappy" Koon, and is one of several houses built in this distinctive manner in the area by Koon.

The house was listed on the National Register of Historic Places in 1999.

See also
National Register of Historic Places listings in Grant County, Arkansas

References

Houses on the National Register of Historic Places in Arkansas
Houses completed in 1940
Buildings and structures in Grant County, Arkansas
National Register of Historic Places in Grant County, Arkansas